Wszemiłowice  is a village in the administrative district of Gmina Kąty Wrocławskie, within Wrocław County, Lower Silesian Voivodeship, in south-western Poland.

Monuments 
 Baroque statue of St. John of Nepomuk

References

Villages in Wrocław County